Antipathozoanthus hickmani is a species of macrocnemic zoanthid first found in the Galapagos. It can be distinguished by its exclusive association with Antipathes galapagensis, and having about 40 tentacles.

References

Further reading
Swain, Timothy D., and Laura M. Swain. "Molecular parataxonomy as taxon description: examples from recently named Zoanthidea (Cnidaria: Anthozoa) with revision based on serial histology of microanatomy." Zootaxa 3796.1 (2014): 81-107.
Bo, Marzia, et al. "Black coral assemblages from Machalilla National Park (Ecuador)." Pacific Science 66.1 (2012): 63-81.

Animals described in 2010
Parazoanthidae